Purishte is a sociolect of the Albanian language spoken by the masons of the Opar region in Western Korçë District, Albania.

Location 
The former commune of Lekas in Western Korçë District consists of mainly speakers of Purisht. It is overall spoken in the thirteen villages of the ethnographic region of Opar in southeastern Albania, which includes parts of the Lekas and Moglica communes.

Diaspora Purisht
Purisht is spoken by those who have migrated out of its home region into the Albanian cities of Korçë, Tiranë and Durrës, as well as by migrants outside of Albania's borders, primarily in Greece.

Vocabulary 
In the Purishte sociolect the mason is called  purja, while the term for the master mason is purja i beshëm.

Romance influence 
Purishte is notable for incorporating a large share of vocabulary of Romance origin, including most notably elements of Aromanian origin. Several aspects of the Aromanian influences in Purishte may be considered Balkanisms.

See also 
 Banjački, south Slavic sociolect of bricklayers in Podrinje, western Balkans
 Meshterski, sociolect of south Bulgarian builders, bricklayers and masons

References

Further reading
Qemal H. Gegollari: E folmja purishte: fjalor purisht-shqip (Purisht-Albanian Dictionary). Tirana: Emal, 2011

Albanian sociolects
Occupational cryptolects